Eastern Rebellion 4 is an album by Eastern Rebellion led by pianist Cedar Walton which was recorded in 1983 and released on the Dutch Timeless label.

Reception

Scott Yanow of AllMusic notes, "The sextet performs four standards and a pair of Walton originals but not much magic occurs during this workmanlike performance". The Penguin Guide to Jazz compared the album unfavorably with earlier Eastern Rebellion releases, and criticized Armenteros's solo development.

Track listing 
All compositions by Cedar Walton except where noted
 "Manteca" (Dizzy Gillespie, Gil Fuller, Chano Pozo) – 7:17  
 "Close Enough for Love" (Johnny Mandel, aul Williams) – 6:30  
 "St. Thomas" (Sonny Rollins) – 4:08  
 "I Am Not Sure" – 6:40  
 "Epistrophy" (Thelonious Monk) – 7:34  
 "Groundwork" – 4:55

Personnel 
Cedar Walton – piano 
Curtis Fuller – trombone
Bob Berg – tenor saxophone
Alfredo "Chocolate" Armenteros – trumpet
David Williams – bass
Billy Higgins – drums

References 

Eastern Rebellion albums
1984 albums
Timeless Records albums